Barlas Channel is a channel,  long and  wide, in the northern part of Laubeuf Fjord, extending southwest from The Gullet and separating Day Island from Adelaide Island. It was first roughly surveyed in 1936 by the British Graham Land Expedition under John Rymill, and resurveyed in 1948 by the Falkland Islands Dependencies Survey, who named it for William Barlas.

References 

Channels of the Southern Ocean
Straits of Adelaide Island